Basharatganj is a town and a nagar panchayat in Bareilly district  in the state of Uttar Pradesh, India.

Demographics
As of the 2011 Indian census, Bisharatganj had a population of 15,975. Males constituted 52% of the population and females 48%. Bisharatganj had an average literacy rate of 76%, higher than the national average of 59.5%; with male literacy of 85% and female literacy of 70%. 22% of the population is under 6 years of age

In 1756 Nawab Meer Bisharat Ali came from Baghdad and used to reside here after whom the town was named Bisharat Ganj. 
He died in 1799 in Bisharat Ganj. Bisharatganj is also related with Bisharada 300 years old holy Hindu temple. Temple is now saying the golden history of bisharad, situated at main road. It was modified second time on 16 July 2010.

Transport 
The town is served by the Basharatganj railway station.

References

Cities and towns in Bareilly district